Matt Hopper (born 29 January 1985) is a rugby union player for Harlequins in the Aviva Premiership. He primarily plays as a Centre but can also cover Fullback.

Hopper started playing mini rugby at age 10 and continued through school and in the junior teams of the Exeter Chiefs, following in the footsteps of his father Keith who captained Exeter during the 1960s. He also played for Wessex and, while studying, for Cardiff University. After graduation Matt spent a year in Australia and played for Manly, before returning to the UK and joining Plymouth Albion.

Following two years with Plymouth, Hopper joined Cornish Pirates in 2010. Pirates were defeated over the two legs of the 2010–11 RFU Championship Final by Worcester, but the team's dynamic playing style had attracted attention from several Premiership clubs and Hopper was recruited to join Harlequins in April 2011.

Hopper made his competitive debut for Quins against Sale Sharks in round 5 of the Aviva Premiership and gained his first start against Gloucester in the Heineken Cup, scoring a try. An injury to George Lowe gave Matt a run in the first XV and he played seven full matches during December 2011 and January 2012, including an away victory against French giants Toulouse. Hopper impressed many during this period and was rewarded with a call up to Stuart Lancaster's Saxons squad to face the Irish Wolfhounds on 28 January 2012.

He was a replacement for Harlequins in their 2011–12 Premiership final victory over Leicester Tigers.

ON 13 April 2017, Hopper to leave Harlequins and join French club Oyonnax in the Top 14 from the 2017–18 season.

References

External links
Harlequins profile

1985 births
Living people
English rugby union players
Harlequin F.C. players
Rugby union players from Exeter
Rugby union centres
Rugby union fullbacks